Francisco de Asís, Duke of Cádiz (Francisco de Asís María Fernando de Borbón; 13 May 1822 – 17 April 1902), sometimes anglicised Francis of Assisi, was King of Spain as the consort of Queen Isabella II of Spain from their marriage on 10 October 1846 until Isabella was overthrown on 30 September 1868. Francisco and his wife were double first cousins, as their fathers were brothers and their mothers were sisters. The royal couple had twelve children, including King Alfonso XII. Isabella was deposed in the Glorious Revolution of 1868, but the monarchy was restored under their son Alfonso XII in 1874. Following his son's accession, Francisco became king father.

Family
Francisco de Asís was born at Aranjuez, Spain, the second son (first to survive infancy) of Infante Francisco de Paula of Spain, and of his wife (and niece), Princess Luisa Carlotta of the Two Sicilies. He was named after Saint Francis of Assisi.

Marriage and children

Francisco married Queen Isabella II of Spain, his double first cousin, on 10 October 1846. There is evidence that Isabella would rather have married his younger brother, Infante Enrique, Duke of Seville, and complained bitterly about her husband's effeminate habits after their first night together.

Twelve children were born during the marriage, of whom five reached adulthood:
 Infanta María Isabel (1851–1931): married her mother's and father's first cousin Prince Gaetan, Count of Girgenti.
 Alfonso XII of Spain (1857–1885).
 Infanta María del Pilar (1861–1879).
 Infanta María de la Paz (1862–1946): married her paternal first cousin Prince Louis Ferdinand of Bavaria.
 Infanta María Eulalia (1864–1958): married her maternal first cousin Don Antonio de Orléans y Borbón, Infante of Spain, Duke of Galliera.

Later life

Starting in 1864, Francisco de Asís acted as president of the Spanish Privy Council (Consejo del Reino). 

In 1868 Francisco went into exile with his wife in France and adopted the incognito title of Count of Moratalla. On 25 June 1870, Isabella abdicated in favour of their son Alfonso XII—whom the 1874 restoration placed on the throne. By then, Francisco de Asís and Isabella had amicably separated and, with time, became good friends.

In 1881 Francisco de Asís took up residence at the château of Épinay-sur-Seine (currently the city hall). He died there in 1902. His wife Isabella and two of his daughters, Isabel and Eulalia, were present at his deathbed.

Honours

Ancestry

References

Bibliography
Bergamini, John D. The Spanish Bourbons: The History of a Tenacious Dynasty. New York: Putnam, 1974. 

|-

|-

House of Bourbon (Spain)
1822 births
1902 deaths
Kings consort
Spanish royal consorts
Dukes of Cádiz
Spanish captain generals
Knights of the Golden Fleece of Spain
Collars of the Order of Isabella the Catholic
Grand Crosses of the Order of Saint-Charles
Grand Crosses of the Order of Saint Stephen of Hungary
Grand Croix of the Légion d'honneur
Knights Grand Cross of the Order of Saints Maurice and Lazarus
Burials in the Pantheon of Kings at El Escorial